The Kuala Gandah Elephant Conservation Centre is an elephant sanctuary located in Temerloh in the state of Pahang, Malaysia. within the Krau Wildlife Reserve.

The Centre was established in 1989 by the Malaysian Department of Wildlife and National Parks, and forms a base for the Elephant Relocation Team, which since 1974 has been rescuing problem Asian elephants whose habitats are being lost to cultivation or development. and relocating them to suitable habitats such as Taman Negara. The Centre also aims to raise public awareness and support research, and has increasingly become a popular tourist attraction since its existence began to be publicised in 1997.

Visitors to the Centre are shown a video, then watch the elephants being washed and fed. This used to be followed by riding on an elephant but now, visitors are being given the chance to go into the river with two younger elephants. Daily visitor admissions are subject to strict quotas and advance booking is strongly recommended.
Since limited budget together with congestion is a growing concern in Elephant centre's management, generating more sustainable source of income has to be considered (e.g. entry fee).

Gallery

References

External links

Tourism Malaysia - Kuala Gandah Elephant Orphanage Sanctuary

Elephant sanctuaries
Wildlife sanctuaries of Malaysia
Tourist attractions in Pahang
Geography of Pahang